Kim Chul-soo may refer to:
 Kim Chul-soo (footballer) (born 1952), South Korean footballer
 Kim Chul-soo (volleyball) (born 1970), South Korean male volleyball player
 Kim Chol-su (born 1982), North Korean judoka